Novus Entertainment (commonly known simply as Novus) is a Canadian telecommunications company providing television, digital phone, and high-speed Internet services via a fiber-optic network. The company is licensed by the Canadian Radio-Television and Telecommunications Commission (the CRTC) as a Class 1 Broadcast Distribution Undertaking for both Metro Vancouver. Novus presently provides services to apartments, condominiums, and businesses in Metro Vancouver. Novus is one of the few broadband Internet carriers in Canada to offer a Fibre-to-the-Building (FTTB) network. The company continues to expand its service in Metro Vancouver.

Novus is also in the business of leasing dark fibre to other communications service providers and to businesses.

Internet
In July 2011, Novus announced its 300 Mbit/s Internet service, claiming to be “Canada’s fastest Internet service” to go into effect July 2011.
Due to its use of Metro Ethernet rather than DOCSIS or DSL technology, the carrier allows a direct RJ-45 connection into a wall jack, circumventing the use of a modem.

In May 2017, Novus announced 1000 Mbit/s internet service.

In April 2021, Novus announced 2500 Mbit/s internet service.

Television
Novus offers analogue and digital (SD and HD) television services.  The carrier continues to add standard and high definition channels to its lineup as they become available.

Beam TV, Novus' own IPTV service was launched in the spring of 2016 with mostly high definition channels. 4K channels are available with more to come.

Telephone
In April 2008, Novus launched its digital phone (VOIP) service through its fibre optic network.

Enterphone is available by request - Have the ability to ring up to 5 local phone numbers in selected buildings.

Novus TV

Novus TV is a locally based community channel operated by Novus Entertainment Inc.

Novus TV covers a variety of events and issues happening in and around Vancouver and the lower mainland and airs numerous locally produced shows, short films, music videos, etc. created by community members.

See also
 Fiber-optic communication

Notes

External links
 Novus Entertainment
 Novus Community TV

Telecommunications companies of Canada
Internet service providers of Canada
Fiber-optic communications
Broadband
Companies based in Vancouver